Boronia gunnii, commonly known as Gunn's boronia or Cataract Gorge boronia is a plant in the citrus family Rutaceae and is endemic to Tasmania. It is an erect shrub with compound leaves and pink or white, four-petalled flowers.

Description
The groups are shorter than the leaves. Flowering occurs from October to January.

Taxonomy and naming
Boronia gunnii was first formally described in 1855 by Joseph Dalton Hooker who published the description in The botany of the Antarctic voyage of H.M. Discovery ships Erebus and Terror from a specimen collected by Ronald Campbell Gunn "on rocks on the South Esk River, near Launceston". The specific epithet (gunnii) honours the collector of the type specimen.

Distribution and habitat
Gunn's boronia grows in the flood zones of watercourses, in rock crevices or between boulders. It is found near several Tasmanian rivers but is considered extinct in Cataract Gorge where it was first discovered.

Conservation
Boronia gunnii is listed as "vulnerable" under the Commonwealth Government Environment Protection and Biodiversity Conservation Act 1999 (EPBC) Act and under the Tasmanian Government Threatened Species Protection Act 1995.The main threats to the species are dieback caused by Phytophthora cinnamomi, inappropriate fire regimes, changes in water flow and weed invasion.

References 

gunnii
Flora of Tasmania
Plants described in 1855
Taxa named by Joseph Dalton Hooker